James Golding (born 10 August 2004) is an Irish professional footballer who plays as a defender for League One club Oxford United.

Club career

Oxford United
On 26 October 2021, Golding made his professional debut, coming on as a substitute for Jamie Hanson in the 78th minute in a 3–2 win against Tottenham Hotspur Academy in the EFL Trophy.

On 11 January 2022, Golding joined Banbury United on an initial month long loan, with the loan later being extended to the end of the season.

On 23 March, Golding signed his first professional contract with United. On 30 April, the final game of the 2021–22 season, Golding was given his first League One start in a 1–1 draw against Doncaster Rovers.

International career
Golding received his first call up to the Republic of Ireland U19 squad on 30 May 2022, ahead of two friendlies against Iceland U19 in Spain. He made his debut on 1 June, coming on in the 77th minute in a 3–0 win.

Career statistics

References

Living people
2004 births
Association football defenders
English footballers
Oxford United F.C. players
Banbury United F.C. players

External links